The abundance of elements in Earth's crust is shown in tabulated form with the estimated crustal abundance for each chemical element shown as mg/kg, or parts per million (ppm) by mass (10,000 ppm = 1%).

Estimates of elemental abundance are difficult because (a) the composition of the upper and lower crust are quite different, and (b) the composition of the continental crust can vary drastically by locality.

List of abundance by element

See also
 Abundances of the elements (data page)
 Atmospheric chemistry
 Clarke number — lists of historical data and terminology
 List of chemical elements
 Primordial nuclide

References

 BookRags, Periodic Table.
 World Book Encyclopedia, Exploring Earth.
 HyperPhysics, Georgia State University, Abundance of Elements in Earth's Crust.
 Data Series 140, Historical Statistics for Mineral and Material Commodities in the United States, Version 2011, USGS .
 Eric Scerri, The Periodic Table, Its Story and Its Significance, Oxford University Press, 2007

Structure of the Earth
Properties of chemical elements
Lists of chemical elements
Earth's crust